Krakel Spektakel is a 2014 Swedish children's film musical directed by Elisabet Gustafsson, based on the character of the same name created by Lennart Hellsing.

The film was produced by Ulf Synnerholm for Filmlance International AB. The script was written by Torbjörn Jansson and cinematography was by Alex Lindén. The film uses live action with painted backdrops.

Plot
Annabell Olsson (Lea Stojanov) is a girl looking for the wizard who turned himself into a glass of lemonade and drank himself, 700 years ago (in the children's song "Trollkarlen från Indialand", with lyrics by Hellsing).

Cast
 Lea Stojanov – Annabell Olsson
 Vanja Blomkvist – Grandpa/Man in the moon
 Anton Lundqvist – Krakel Spektakel
 Lina Ljungqvist – Cousin Vitamin
 Martin Eliasson – Opsis Kalopsis
 Anki Larsson – Berit Blomkål
 Olof Wretling – Brother Gurka 1
 Sven Björklund – Brother Gurka 2
 Ika Nord – Coachman
 Ivan Mathias Petersson – Peter Palsternack
 Shima Niavarani – Selma Selleri
 Michael Jonsson – Gabriel Gräslök
 Henrik Dorsin – Emperor of China
 Carl Englén – Dinkelidunk, the monk
 Mikael Odhag – Man in the moon
 Vanna Rosenberg – Mama
 Andreas La Chenardière – Papa

Reception
One critic found the film a delightful new creation based on various works by Hellsing, and also referring to classics like The Wizard of Oz, The Lord of the Rings, and Alice in Wonderland, while another considered it a failed attempt to profit from Hellsing's beloved characters.

References

External links 
 Krakel Spektakel at the Swedish Film Database 

Films based on children's books
Swedish children's films
2014 films
2010s Swedish films